The Tropical Park Oaks is an American Thoroughbred horse race run at Calder Race Course in Miami Gardens, Florida, usually on New Year's Day.  The one and one sixteenth mile ungraded stakes turf event for 3-year-old fillies offers a purse of $100,000 added.

The race is named for the old Tropical Park Race Track.

Past winners
 1995 – Rose Law Firm (Mike E. Smith)
 1996 – Lulu's Ransom (Herb McCauley)
 1997 – Reach the Top (José A. Santos)   
 1998 – To Be Approved (Eibar Coa)
 1999 – Bal d'Argent
 2000 – Solvig (Pat Day)
 2001 - Voodoo Dancer (Rene Douglas)
 2002 – Stormy Frolic (Jerry Bailey)
 2003 – Sweettrickydancer (Eibar Coa)
 2004 – Bobbi Use (Eibar Coa)
 2005 – Dansetta Light (John Velazquez)
 2006 – J'ray
 2007 - Christmas Kid (Kent Desormeaux) 
 2008 – Bsharpsonata (Eric Camacho)

External links
Calder Race Course official website

Tropical Park Race Track
Horse races in the United States
Turf races in the United States